Crataegus jonesae is a species of hawthorn native to New England and Canada. It is named in honor of landscape architect Beatrix Jones Farrand, who first noticed it and brought it to Charles Sprague Sargent's attention.

References

jonesiae
Flora of North America